The 2012 World Seniors Championship (Known for sponsorship reasons as the Wyldecrest Park Homes World Seniors Championship) was a professional non-ranking snooker tournament that took place between 27 and 28 October 2012 at the Mountbatten Centre in Portsmouth, England.

Darren Morgan was the defending champion, but he lost in the semi-finals 0–2 against Nigel Bond.

Bond won in the final 2–0 against Tony Chappel. Bond won 14 frames in a row by beating all of his opponents with 2–0.

Prize fund
The breakdown of prize money for this year is shown below: 
Winner: £18,000
Runner-up: £8,000
Semi-finalist: £4,000
Quarter-finalist: £2,000
Last 16: £1,000
Total: £50,000

Main draw
The draw for the last 16 was made on the evening of 13 September 2012 at The Sands in Carlisle during the Premier League. The draw for the quarter-finals and semi-finals was made on a random basis. All matches were best of 3 frames. The times for 27 October are BST and those for 28 October are GMT. The highest break of the tournament was 86 made by Karl Townsend.

Last 16

 Saturday, 27 October – 13:00
  Darren Morgan 2–0  Joe Johnson
  Dennis Taylor 0–2  Nigel Bond  Dene O'Kane 2–0  Barry West
  Steve Davis 2–1  Cliff Thorburn

 Saturday, 27 October – 19:00
  Tony Drago 1–2  Tony Chappel
  Karl Townsend 1–2  Tony Knowles
  Alain Robidoux 2–0  Les Dodd
  Jimmy White 2–0  Mike Hallett

Quarter-finals
 Sunday, 28 October – 13:00
  Steve Davis 0–2  Darren Morgan
  Dene O'Kane 2–1  Jimmy White
  Alain Robidoux 0–2  Tony Chappel
  Tony Knowles 0–2  Nigel Bond

Semi-finals
 Sunday, 28 October – 19:00
  Nigel Bond 2–0  Darren Morgan
  Tony Chappel 2–1  Dene O'Kane

Final
 Sunday, 28 October – 19:00
  Nigel Bond 2–0  Tony Chappel

Qualifying
These matches took place on 30 September 2012 at the World Snooker Academy, Sheffield, England. There was only one century break during the qualifying. Nigel Bond made a 101 against Gary Wilkinson.

References

2012
2012 in snooker
2012 in English sport
October 2012 sports events in the United Kingdom
Sport in Portsmouth